Chris Evert-Lloyd was the defending champion but did not compete that year.

Andrea Temesvári won in the final 6–1, 6–0 against Bonnie Gadusek.

Seeds
A champion seed is indicated in bold text while text in italics indicates the round in which that seed was eliminated. The top eight seeds received a bye to the second round.

  Virginia Ruzici (third round)
  Kathy Rinaldi (semifinals)
  Andrea Temesvári (champion)
  Bonnie Gadusek (final)
  Evonne Goolagong Cawley (second round)
  Yvonne Vermaak (third round)
  Jo Durie (quarterfinals)
  Helena Suková (quarterfinals)
  Manuela Maleeva (third round)
  Mima Jaušovec (third round)
  Lisa Bonder (second round)
  Catherine Tanvier (first round)
  Ivanna Madruga-Osses (third round)
  Iva Budařová (third round)

Draw

Finals

Top half

Section 1

Section 2

Bottom half

Section 3

Section 4

References
 1983 Italian Open Draw (Archived 2009-08-14)

Women's Singles